Robert "Roby" Platt (1952-2014) was a French slalom canoeist who competed from the late 1970s to the early 1980s. He won a silver medal in the C-2 team event at the 1979 ICF Canoe Slalom World Championships in Jonquière.

References

French male canoeists
1952 births
2014 deaths
Medalists at the ICF Canoe Slalom World Championships